Joseph Racine (18 July 1891 – 28 October 1914) was a French cyclist. He competed in two events at the 1912 Summer Olympics. He was killed in action during World War I.

See also
 List of Olympians killed in World War I

References

External links
 

1891 births
1914 deaths
French male cyclists
Olympic cyclists of France
Cyclists at the 1912 Summer Olympics
Sportspeople from Clichy, Hauts-de-Seine
French military personnel killed in World War I
Cyclists from Île-de-France